In physics and color science, the Planckian locus or black body locus is the path or locus that the color of an incandescent black body would take in a particular chromaticity space as the blackbody temperature changes.  It goes from deep red at low temperatures through orange, yellowish white, white, and finally bluish white at very high temperatures.

A color space is a three-dimensional space; that is, a color is specified by a set of three numbers (the CIE coordinates X, Y, and Z, for example, or other values such as hue, colorfulness, and luminance) which specify the color and brightness of a particular homogeneous visual stimulus. A chromaticity is a color projected into a two-dimensional space that ignores brightness.  For example, the standard CIE XYZ color space projects directly to the corresponding chromaticity space specified by the two chromaticity coordinates known as x and y, making the familiar chromaticity diagram shown in the figure.  The Planckian locus, the path that the color of a black body takes as the blackbody temperature changes, is often shown in this standard chromaticity space.

The Planckian locus in the XYZ color space 

In the CIE XYZ color space, the three coordinates defining a color are given by X, Y, and Z:

where M(λ,T) is the spectral radiant exitance of the light being viewed, and X(λ), Y(λ) and Z(λ) are the color matching functions of the CIE standard colorimetric observer, shown in the diagram on the right, and λ is the wavelength. The Planckian locus is determined by substituting into the above equations the black body spectral radiant exitance, which is given by Planck's law:

where:
c1 = 2hc2 is the first radiation constant
c2 = hc/k is the second radiation constant

and:
M is the black body spectral radiant exitance (power per unit area per unit wavelength: watt per square meter per meter (W/m3))
T is the temperature of the black body
h is Planck's constant
c is the speed of light
k is Boltzmann's constant

This will give the Planckian locus in CIE XYZ color space. If these coordinates are XT, YT, ZT where T is the temperature, then the CIE chromaticity coordinates will be

Note that in the above formula for Planck’s Law, you might as well use c1L = 2hc2 (the first radiation constant for spectral radiance) instead of c1 (the “regular” first radiation constant), in which case the formula would give the spectral radiance L(λ,T) of the black body instead of the spectral radiant exitance M(λ,T). However, this change only affects the absolute values of XT, YT and ZT, not the values relative to each other. Since XT, YT and ZT are usually normalized to YT = 1 (or  YT = 100) and are normalized when xT and yT are calculated, the absolute values of XT, YT and ZT do not matter. For practical reasons, c1 might therefore simply be replaced by 1.

Approximation
The Planckian locus in xy space is depicted as a curve in the chromaticity diagram above. While it is possible to compute the CIE xy co-ordinates exactly given the above formulas, it is faster to use approximations. Since the mired scale changes more evenly along the locus than the temperature itself, it is common for such approximations to be functions of the reciprocal temperature. Kim et al. uses a cubic spline:

[[File:Planckian-locus-approximation.png|thumb|Kim et al.'''s approximation to the Planckian locus (shown in red). The notches demarcate the three splines (shown in blue).]]

The Planckian locus can also be approximated in the CIE 1960 color space, which is used to compute CCT and CRI, using the following expressions:

Alternatively, one can use the chromaticity (x, y) coordinates estimated from above to derive the corresponding (u, v), if a larger range of temperatures is required.

Correlated color temperature

The mathematical procedure for determining the correlated color temperature involves finding the closest point to the light source's white point on the Planckian locus. Since the CIE's 1959 meeting in Brussels, the Planckian locus has been computed using the CIE 1960 color space, also known as MacAdam's (u,v) diagram. Today, the CIE 1960 color space is deprecated for other purposes:

Owing to the perceptual inaccuracy inherent to the concept, it suffices to calculate to within 2K at lower CCTs and 10K at higher CCTs to reach the threshold of imperceptibility.

International Temperature Scale
The Planckian locus is derived by the determining the chromaticity values of a Planckian radiator using the standard colorimetric observer. The relative spectral power distribution (SPD) of a Planckian radiator follows Planck's law, and depends on the second radiation constant, . As measuring techniques have improved, the General Conference on Weights and Measures has revised its estimate of this constant, with the International Temperature Scale (and briefly, the International Practical Temperature Scale''). These successive revisions caused a shift in the Planckian locus and, as a result, the correlated color temperature scale. Before ceasing publication of standard illuminants, the CIE worked around this problem by explicitly specifying the form of the SPD, rather than making references to black bodies and a color temperature. Nevertheless, it is useful to be aware of previous revisions in order to be able to verify calculations made in older texts:
  (ITS-27). Note: Was in effect during the standardization of Illuminants A, B, C (1931), however the CIE used the value recommended by the U.S. National Bureau of Standards, 1.435 × 10−2
  (IPTS-48). In effect for Illuminant series D (formalized in 1967).
  (ITS-68), (ITS-90). Often used in recent papers.
  (CODATA, 2010)
  (CODATA, 2014)
  (CODATA, 2018). Current value, as of 2020. The 2019 redefinition of the SI base units fixed the Boltzmann constant to an exact value. Since the Planck constant and the speed of light were already fixed to exact values, that means that c₂ is now an exact value as well. Note that ... doesn't indicate a repeating fraction; it merely means that of this exact value only the first ten digits are shown.

References

External links
Numerical table of color temperature and the corresponding xy and sRGB coordinates for both the 1931 and 1964 CMFs, by Mitchell Charity.

Color space